Hovsvatnet is a lake in the municipality of Lund in Rogaland county, Norway.  The lake lies between the villages of Eik (in the north) and Moi in the south.  The European route E39 highway runs along the whole southern shore of the V-shaped lake.  Most of the sides of the lake have high mountains on the shoreline, preventing habitation along most of the lake.

See also
List of lakes in Norway

References

Lund, Norway
Lakes of Rogaland